If I Don't Come Home You'll Know I'm Gone is the second album by Canadian independent rock band The Wooden Sky, released in August 2009.

Track listing
All songs written by Gavin Gardiner and The Wooden Sky, except where noted.

"Oh My God (It Still Means a Lot to Me)"  – 3:28
"(Bit Part)" – 3:18
"Angels" – 2:11
"My Old Ghosts" – 3:02
"Call If You Need Me." – 2:45
"When We Were Young" – 3:15
"An Evening Hymn" – 4:11 (Jonas Bonnetta and Gavin Gardiner)
"Something Hiding for Us in the Night." – 5:29
"Oslo" – 3:06
"The Late King Henry" – 2:24
"Lock and Key" - 3:48
"Fairweather Friends" - 4:20
"River Song One" - 3:45

2009 albums
The Wooden Sky albums
Albums produced by Howard Bilerman